Hadith of Jesus Praying Behind Mahdi refers to a collection of hadith related to the prophecy that after Jesus (Isa) descends from heaven to join the Mahdi and his followers in the final days before the destruction of Earth, Jesus will decline the offer of the Mahdi to lead the Mahdi and company in salat (Islamic ritual prayer which Muslims perform five times a day) telling the Mahdi to lead. The Mahdi is an Islamic figure in Islamic eschatology, and salat is the Islamic practice of worship of God. The prophecy is narrated in numerous hadith collections. A total of 29 Hadiths relate the return of Jesus, and his prayer with Mahdi's lead. The story is sometimes said to establish the importance the acknowledgement of this by a prophet, namely Jesus.

Hadith

Both Sunni and Shia hadith narrate this story.

Allamah Sayyid Sa'eed Akhtar Rizvi quotes the above tradition in his book "Muhammad (S) is the Last Prophet" and concludes:

Abu Ya’ala provides another version of this hadith in his musnad with more clear terms.

Interpretation
Sunni and Shia Muslims hold that Isa (Jesus) and the Mahdi will be present at the same time, that the leaders who will carry out their commands will be from the Quraysh tribe, and that afterward Isa (Jesus) will be the Vizier of the Mahdi. It's also believed that he will perform the prayer behind Mahdi and follow him. Jalaluddin al-Suyuti writes in his Nuzool Isa Ibn Maryam Akhir al-Zaman that:

See also
 Mahdi
 Jesus in Islam
 Signs of the appearance of Mahdi

References

Hadith
Christianity and Islam
Mahdism
Jesus in Islam